Princess Charlotte was a 60-ton brig launched in 1819 that disappeared in 1820 on a voyage between Hobart Town and Sydney.

The Government constructed Princess Charlotte in 1819 at Newcastle, New South Wales. She was primarily used for transport and conveying cargo up and down the colony's east coast. On 27 July 1820 she conveyed 33 convicts (5 female and 28 male) from Sydney to the penal punishment station at Newcastle.  returning with coal and timber harvested along the Hunter Rover. 

She left Hobart Town on 27 September 1820 for Sydney with crew and passengers and a cargo of wheat.  The passengers included four soldiers from the 48th Regiment and at least three convicts.  The captain was Edward Devine. She was not heard from again.

References

1819 ships
Ships built in New South Wales
Shipwrecks of Australia
History of Tasmania
Maritime incidents in September 1820
Missing ships of Australia
Ships lost with all hands